Camille Emilie Razat (born 1 March 1994) is a French actress and model. She is known for playing Lea Morel in France 2 drama The Disappearance, and for playing Camille in the Netflix television series Emily in Paris.

Biography 
Camille Razat was born in Saint-Jean, Haute-Garonne. She completed her schooling at the Lycée Saint-Sernin in Toulouse.

Filmography

References

External links 
 
 

Living people
1994 births
Actresses from Toulouse
French television actresses